The Kayrakkum Dam, also spelt variously as Kayrakum, Kairakum, Qayraqqum or Qayroqqum, is an embankment dam on the Syr Darya River near the town of Kayrakkum in Sughd Province, Tajikistan. It is situated on the western edge of the Fergana Valley and creates Kayrakkum Reservoir. The reservoir supplies water for irrigation, primarily in Uzbekistan downstream, and hydroelectric power production. The reservoir is also a Ramsar site. The dam's power station has an installed capacity of 126 MW and is operated by Barki Tojik. Construction on the dam began in 1952. It began to impound its reservoir in 1956 and the first two generators were commissioned that year. The other four were operational in 1957 and the project was complete in 1959. The power station is currently undergoing a rehabilitation which should be completed in 2020. Two new and larger turbines will increase the installed capacity to 142 MW.

Its spillway and power station are co-located on the left side of the dam in a gravity dam section. The power station houses six 21 MW Kaplan turbine-generators. Of the total reservoir capacity,  can be used for irrigation downstream and/or power generation.  is dead or unusable storage.

See also

Farkhad Dam – downstream

References

Dams in Tajikistan
Embankment dams
Dams completed in 1956
Hydroelectric power stations in Tajikistan
1959 establishments in Takijistan
Energy infrastructure completed in 1957
Sughd Region
Hydroelectric power stations built in the Soviet Union
Dams on the Syr Darya River